The  is a Japanese new religion founded by Matsumura Kaiseki in 1907 which synthesizes aspects of Christian, Confucian, Daoist, and traditional Japanese thought. Its four main tenets are theism (Japanese: 信神), ethical cultivation (Japanese: 修徳), neighborly love (Japanese: 愛隣), and a belief in eternal life (Japanese: 永生).

Notable members 
Ōkawa Shūmei, Japanese nationalist and Pan-Asian ideologue

References

 Suzuki, Studies of Trends in Meiji Religious Thought.
 Matsumura, A Critique of Religions.

Christianity in Japan
Christian organizations established in 1907
Christian new religious movements
1907 establishments in Japan